is a Japanese actress, singer and model.

Biography
Maeda is notable for performing Shiori Kitano in the 2003 film Battle Royale II: Requiem, as well as for voicing the title role in the anime series Kino's Journey (for which she also performed a theme song to the series, "The Beautiful World").  Her younger sister is Aki Maeda. Ai Maeda came into the spotlight when she was only 8 years old, appearing in a McDonald's commercial. From there her career started off. She modeled along with her sister Aki Maeda when they were young until she was 16/17 years old, when she starred in many movies and TV series.

Maeda is skilled in the piano, Tate (fighting battles on the movie set) and the English language (Ai studied abroad in Canada for a year in 2000). She starred in the 3-D Ghost horror film Shock Labyrinth 3D, which was directed by Takashi Shimizu.

She is a graduate of Aoyama Gakuin University (Faculty of Economics, International Politics and Communications).

On October 28, 2009, Maeda married Kabuki actor Nakamura Kankurō VI and they have two sons.

Career
 1993: Debuted in a McDonald's commercial together with her sister Aki. She was in her fourth year of primary school.
 1994: Ai and Aki joined the manager firm "Crayon".
 1994 April: Became a regular cast of the show Appare-Sanma Sensei.
 1997: Changed manager to "Granpapa".
 1997: Formed the group "Pretty Chat" with Maya Hamaoka, Yuuka Nomura and Ayako Omura, releasing a single album "Wake up girls".
 2003: On her 20th birthday she voiced her first anime Kino no Tabi.

Filmography

Discography

Mini-albums
 Night Fly [2005.03.16]

Singles
 the Beautiful World
The title track was used in Kino's Journey ending theme

References

External links 
 Official Website (In Japanese) http://www.granpapa.com/1251277177523/
 
 

1983 births
Living people
Japanese child actresses
Japanese women pop singers
Japanese film actresses
Japanese rhythm and blues singers
Japanese television actresses
Japanese voice actresses
Japanese female models
Actresses from Tokyo
Aoyama Gakuin University alumni
20th-century Japanese actresses
21st-century Japanese actresses
21st-century Japanese women singers
21st-century Japanese singers